The National Ground is a cricket ground in Islamabad, Pakistan. The first recorded match on the ground was in the 2009/10 season. The ground has hosted thirty first-class matches since 2009. It was selected as a venue to host matches in the 2016–17 Regional One Day Cup.

See also
 List of cricket grounds in Pakistan

References

External links
National Ground at CricketArchive

Cricket grounds in Pakistan
2009 establishments in Pakistan